Amatka is a 2012 novel by Karin Tidbeck, originally written in Swedish, and published in English in 2017. Set in a world shaped by language, it follows Vanja who is sent to the Amatka colony on a work assignment where she falls in love with her housemate. Central themes of the novel include political oppression, limited freedom and deep conspiracies.

Summary 
Coming from the colony of Essre, Vanja (formally known as Brilars' Vanja Essre Two) is sent by a government body to Amatka in order to find out what hygiene products the people there use. She goes on to live in a house with three others, namely Nina (Ulltors' Nina Four), Ivar (Jondis' Ivar), and Ulla (Sarols' Ulla Three), all of whom have at present or at some time contributed to the workings of Amatka.

Despite her misgivings about Vanja's mission, Nina introduces the Essre resident to the departments in the colony so she could gather more information for her research. As the days progress, however, Vanja meets specialists from different fields and is eventually led to discover that Amatka — along with the other colonies — may not be as it appears.

Translations 
In addition to the original Swedish edition, published by Mix in 2012, the novel has been translated into multiple languages:
 Spanish, published by Ediciones Nevsky, 2016
 English, published by Vintage, 2017
 Hungarian, published by Athenaeum, 2017
 French, published by La Volte, 2018
 Portuguese, published by 20|20, 2018

Awards 
Amatka is regarded as one of the best science fiction book of Guardian in year 2017. It was nominated for following awards:
 Locus Award Finalist 2018
 Compton Award 2018 
 Prix Utopiales 2018

References

2012 fantasy novels
Swedish fantasy novels
Weird fiction novels